Aveiras de Cima is a little Portuguese town by the A1 highway. It is situated in the Lisbon District and in the Azambuja Municipality. The population in 2011 was 4,762, in an area of 26.16 km².

References

Towns in Portugal
Parishes of Azambuja